East Deer Township is a township in Allegheny County, Pennsylvania, United States. The population was 1,500 at the 2010 census.

Geography 

Surrounding neighborhoods 
East Deer Township has three land borders, including Frazer to the north, south and west, Tarentum to the northeast, and a very small border with Springdale Township to the south-southeast along the Allegheny River.  Across the river in Westmoreland County, East Deer runs adjacent with Arnold.

Government and Politics

Demographics 

At the 2000 census there were 1,362 people, 606 households, and 350 families living in the township.  The population density was 590.3 people per square mile (227.6/km2).  There were 682 housing units at an average density of 295.6/sq mi (114.0/km2).  The racial makeup of the township was 96.84% White, 1.91% African American, 0.15% Asian, 0.07% from other races, and 1.03% from two or more races. Hispanic or Latino of any race were 0.07%.

East Deer residents reported 19% being of German ancestry, 19% of Italian ancestry, 13% Irish ancestry, 11% Polish ancestry and 10% Slovak ancestry in 2000.

There were 606 households, 23.4% had children under the age of 18 living with them, 41.4% were married couples living together, 12.0% had a female householder with no husband present, and 42.2% were non-families. 37.1% of households were made up of individuals, and 16.5% were one person aged 65 or older.  The average household size was 2.16 and the average family size was 2.82.

The age distribution was 18.8% under the age of 18, 7.0% from 18 to 24, 32.5% from 25 to 44, 18.4% from 45 to 64, and 23.3% 65 or older.  The median age was 41 years. For every 100 females there were 81.8 males.  For every 100 females age 18 and over, there were 77.2 males.

The median household income was $30,078 and the median family income  was $38,839. Males had a median income of $28,894 versus $24,792 for females. The per capita income for the township was $17,108.  About 5.4% of families and 7.9% of the population were below the poverty line, including 6.5% of those under age 18 and 8.0% of those age 65 or over.

References 

Townships in Allegheny County, Pennsylvania